Esenguly District   is a district of Balkan Province in Turkmenistan. The administrative center of the district is the town of Esenguly

Awards
Esenguly District won the award of "best district" in the country for 2018, along with $1 million in prize money.

References

Districts of Turkmenistan
Balkan Region